West Ujimqin Banner (Mongolian:    Baraɣun Ujumučin qosiɣu) is a banner of Inner Mongolia, People's Republic of China. It is under the administration of Xilin Gol League.

Climate
West Ujimqin has a dry, monsoon-influenced humid continental climate (Köppen Dwb), with bitterly cold and very dry winters, very warm, somewhat humid summers, and strong winds, especially in spring. With monthly percent possible sunshine ranging from 57% in July to 72% in October and February, sunshine is abundant year-round, there are 2,882 hours of bright sunshine annually.

References
www.xzqh.org

External links

Banners of Inner Mongolia